Nabia was the goddess of rivers and water in Gallaecian and Lusitanian mythology, in the territory of modern Galicia (Spain), Asturias (Spain) and Portugal.

The present-day Navia River and Avia (river) in Galicia and Asturias, the Neiva River, near Braga (Bracara Augusta, old Roman capital of Gallaecia) and the Nabão River which passes through the city of Tomar may all share the etymology of the goddess's name.

The goddess Nabia was very popular in the territory of the Callaici Bracari with several inscriptions, like the one at Braga's Fonte do Ídolo (Portuguese for Fountain of the Idol).

See also
Castro culture
Pre-Roman peoples of the Iberian Peninsula

References
 Coutinhas, José Manuel. Aproximação à identidade etno-cultural dos Callaici Bracari. Porto. 2006.
 García Fernández-Albalat, Blanca. Guerra y Religión en la Gallaecia y la Lusitania Antiguas. A Coruña. 1990.
 Olivares Pedreño, Juan Carlos. Los Dioses de la Hispania Céltica. Madrid. 2002.

Further reading
 Abad, Rosa Brañas. "Navia. La gran diosa galaica". In: Memoria del agua: la tradición y el imaginario galaicos. Ladislao Castro Pérez (ed. lit.), María Eugenia Muñoz Fernández (ed. lit.), 2021, págs. 87-132. . 
 Fernández-Albalat, Blanca García. "La diosa Nabia: nueva interpretación". In: Actas 1er. Congreso Peninsular de Historia Antigua : Santiago de Compostela, 1-5 julio 1986. Gerardo Pereira Menaut (dir. congr.), Vol. 2, 1988, págs. 249-261. .
 Olivares Pedreño, Juan Carlos. "El culto a Nabia en Hispania y las diosas polifuncionales indoeuropeas". In: Lucentum, ISSN-e 1989-9904, Nº 17-18, 1998-1999, págs. 229-242. .
 . "El nombre de la diosa lusitana Nabia y el problema del betacismo en las lenguas del occidente peninsular". In: Ilu 2 (1997): 141-149.

External links

 Religiões da Lusitânia (in Portuguese)
 El nombre de la diosa lusitana Nabia (in Spanish)

Sea and river goddesses
Lusitanian goddesses
Gallaecian goddesses